Joseph Lanigan (8 July 1891 – 30 September 1972) was an Australian cricketer. He played two first-class matches for Western Australia between 1921/22 and 1922/23.

See also
 List of Western Australia first-class cricketers

References

External links
 

1891 births
1972 deaths
Australian cricketers
Western Australia cricketers